Leena Gangopadhyay is an Indian writer, producer, and director, primarily associated with the Tollywood film industry. As of 27 June 2022, she is serving as the Chairperson of West Bengal Commission for Women.

Works

Films

Television

Awards

References

Living people
Bengali film directors
Bengali-language writers
Trinamool Congress politicians from West Bengal
University of Calcutta alumni
1970 births